Taka N'Gangué (born 1896, date of death unknown) was a French athlete. He competed in the men's javelin throw at the 1924 Summer Olympics.

References

External links
 

1896 births
Year of death missing
Athletes (track and field) at the 1924 Summer Olympics
French male javelin throwers
Olympic athletes of France
Place of birth missing